The 1994–95 season of the FA Women's Premier League was the fourth season of national top-flight league women's football in England. It was the first season under FA Premier League branding after the WFA Women's National League was founded in 1991–92.

Below the FA Women's Premier League National Division were the Northern and Southern Divisions.

The 1993–94 double-winners Doncaster Belles and League Cup winners Arsenal Ladies continued their rivalry in the National Division. Arsenal won their "fiercely contested" early-season match 3–0 with goals by Sammy Britton, Rebecca Lonergan and Jo Churchman.

At the end of 1994–95, Arsenal won their second title and equalled Doncaster's two championships at that point. The runners-up were Liverpool Ladies, renamed in 1994 and previously known as Knowsley United. The 1991–92 runner-up club were relegated, Red Star Southampton.

The season did not finish on time, according to The Independent in August 1995: "The Football Association doesn't help much. It took over the national team two years ago, and the administration of the domestic game last season - which then shambolically overran, ending six weeks late.".

National Division

See also
 UEFA Women's Euro 1995

References

External links
Ilkeston Football: Ladies Football

Eng
women
FA Women's National League seasons
1